HD 203842, also known as HR 8191 or rarely 30 G. Equueli, is a solitary, yellowish-white hued star located in the constellation Equuleus. It has an apparent magnitude of 6.32, placing it near the limit for naked eye visibility, even under ideal conditions. At its current distance HD 203842's brightness is diminished by 0.15 magnitudes due to interstellar dust and it has an absolute magnitude of +1.06.

A 2005 Hipparcos survey noticed variations in its proper motion, which would indicate that it is an astrometric binary. However, a subsequent survey revealed that HD 203842 is not an astrometric binary (32% chance) and is more likely to be solitary. This object is part of the Hyades Stream. 

HD 203842 has a stellar classification of F5 III, indicating that it is an evolved F-type giant star. It is currently in the Hertzsprung gap, meaning that it exhausting its supply of hydrogen and evolving towards the red giant branch. It has double times the Sun's mass but at the age of 1.24 billion years, it has expanded to 4.54 times the Sun's radius.

References

F-type giants
Equuleus
203842
8191
Equulei, 30
105695
Durchmusterung objects
Hyades Stream